Paraguay consists of 17 departments (singular – departamento) and one capital district (distrito capital). The country is divided into two regions: The "Occidental Region" or Chaco (Boquerón, Alto Paraguay and Presidente Hayes), and the "Oriental Region" or Parana (other departments and the capital district).

See also
Ranked list of Paraguayan departments
List of regions of Paraguay by Human Development Index
ISO 3166-2:PY

External links 
 

 
Subdivisions of Paraguay
Paraguay, Departments
Departments, Paraguay
Paraguay geography-related lists